Kanichi is a rural locality (a selo) in Dmitriyevsky Selsoviet of Mazanovsky District, Amur Oblast, Russia. The population was 58 as of 2018. There is 1 street.

Geography 
Kanichi is located on the left bank of the Birma River, 49 km south of Novokiyevsky Uval (the district's administrative centre) by road. Dmitriyevka is the nearest rural locality.

References 

Rural localities in Mazanovsky District